Culebra (meaning snake in Spanish) may refer to:

 Culebra, Puerto Rico, an island
 Culebra Cut, an artificial valley in the Panama Canal
 Culebra Peak, in Colorado, United States
 Culebra River (disambiguation)
 Sierra de la Culebra, a mountain range in Castile and León, Spain
 Isla Culebra, the Spanish name of Sedge Island, part of the Falkland archipelago

See also